This article is about the demographic features of the population of Montenegro, including population density, ethnicity, education level, health of the populace, economic status, religious affiliations and other aspects of the population.

Population censuses

According to a 2015 estimate made by the Statistical Office of Montenegro, Montenegro has 622,159 inhabitants.
According to a 2016 estimate made by the Statistical Office of Montenegro, Montenegro has 622,303 inhabitants.
According to a 2017 estimate made by the Statistical Office of Montenegro, Montenegro has 622,373 inhabitants.
According to a 2018 estimate made by the Statistical Office of Montenegro, Montenegro has 622,227 inhabitants.
According to a 2019 estimate made by the Statistical Office of Montenegro, Montenegro has 622,028 inhabitants.

Vital statistics

Source: Statistical Office of Montenegro

Current vital statistics

Marriages and divorces

Nationality/Ethnicity

Ethnic population 1948–20111
The vast majority (over 90%) of the population of Montenegro is of Slavic origin. Albanians make up 5 percent of the population (4.9% at the 2011 census), while there is also a small Romani minority (total 1.2% at the 2011 census). The Slavic population of Montenegro uses a large diversity in ethnic identities to describe their ethnicity. During the first decades after WW II most Slavic people identified themselves as Montenegrins, with less than 2% Serbs and less than 2% Croats in 1948. During the last decades of the existence of Yugoslavia up to 5% of the population declared themselves Yugoslavs (South-Slavs). During and after the Yugoslav Wars the ethnic identity of the Serbs (and in general the political influence of Serbia) became increasingly important in Montenegro and at the 2003 census almost one third of the population identified themselves as Serbs. The Serbs live mostly along the borders with Bosnia and Serbia, while the Montenegrins live in the center of the country. The Slavic population are in majority Eastern Orthodox Christians, but there is also a large Muslim minority, like in Bosnia and Herzegovina. Although most of the Slavic Muslims in Montenegro initially also identified themselves as Montenegrins, gradually over time more and more Slavic Muslims started to use the term Muslim as an ethnic designation, thus opting for a distinctive ethno-religious identity. After the Yugoslav Wars this changed again and at the 2003 and 2011 census most ethnic Muslims declared themselves Bosniaks, mainly because they had some historical relations with Bosniaks in Bosnia and Herzegovina and mostly live in the northeast of Montenegro.

Ethnic structure by region
According to the 2011 census 
Source: Statistical Office of Montenegro

According to the 2003 census (November 2003 data)

Andrijevica
total 6.384
 Montenegrins 1.475 or 23,10%
 Ethnic Muslims 8 or 0,13%
 Serbs 4.155 or 65,08%
 Albanians 0 or 0,00%
 Croats 2 or 0,03%
 Bosniaks 0 or 0,00%
 Romani 0 or 0,00%
 other 22 or 0,34%

 not declared 234 or 3,67%
 no data 488 or 7,64%

Bar
total 45.223
 Montenegrins 19.960 or 44,14%
 Ethnic Muslims 2.852 or 6,31%
 Serbs 11.218 or 24,81%
 Albanians 5.450 or 12,05%
 Croats 268 or 0,59%
 Bosniaks 1.026 or 2,27%
 Romani 50 or 0,11%
 other 722 or 1,60%
 not declared 1.771 or 3,92%
 no data 1.906 or 4,21%

Berane
total 40.885
 Montenegrins 9282 or 22,70%
 Ethnic Muslims 2.994 or 7,32%
 Serbs 16.939 or 41,43%
 Albanians 41 or 0,10%
 Croats 50 or 0,12%
 Bosniaks 8.994 or 22,00%
 Romani 133 or 0,33%
 other 222 or 0,54%
 not declared 223 or 0,55%
 no data 837 or 2,05%

Bijelo Polje
total 57.124
 Montenegrins 9.214 or 16,13%
 Ethnic Muslims 9.816 or 17,18%
 Serbs 20.743 or 36,31%
 Albanians 35 or 0,06%
 Croats 49 or 0,09%
 Bosniaks 14.409 or 25,22%
 Romani 146 or 0,26%

 other 165 or 0,29%
 not declared 1.033 or 1,81%
 no data 1.514 or 2,65%

Budva
total 16.095
 Montenegrins 7.333 or 45,56%
 Ethnic Muslims 205 or 1,27%
 Serbs 6.510 or 40,45%
 Albanians 60 or 0,37%
 Croats 177 or 1,10%
 Bosniaks 22 or 0,14%
 Romani 37 or 0,23%
 other 460 or 2,86%
 not declared 1.153 or 7,16%
 no data 138 or 0,86%

Cetinje
total 18.749
 Montenegrins 16.927 or 90,28%
 Ethnic Muslims 21 or 0,11%
 Serbs 865 or 4,61%
 Albanians 46 or 0,25%
 Croats 47 or 0,25%
 Bosniaks 5 or 0,03%
 Romani 131 or 0,70%
 other 170 or 0,91%
 not declared 303 or 1,62%
 no data 234 or 1,25%

Danilovgrad
total 16.400
 Montenegrins 11.141 or 67,93%
 Ethnic Muslims 53 or 0,32%
 Serbs 4.177 or 25,47%
 Albanians 8 or 0,05%
 Croats 42 or 0,26%
 Bosniaks 0 or 0,00%
 Romani 11 or 0,07%
 other 127 or 0,77%
 not declared 428 or 2,61%
 no data 413 or 2,52%

Herceg Novi
total 33971
 Montenegrins 9.651 or 28,41%
 Ethnic Muslims 218 or 0,64%
 Serbs 17.818 or 52,45%
 Albanians 25 or 0,07%
 Croats 831 or 2,45%
 Bosniaks 89 or 0,26%
 Romani 290 or 0,85%
 other 1.350 or 3,97%
 not declared 2.800 or 8,24%
 no data 899 or 2,65%

Kolašin
total 9.975
 Montenegrins 5.022 or 50,35%
 Ethnic Muslims 34 or 0,34%
 Serbs 4.449 or 44,60%
 Albanians 1 or 0,01%
 Croats 11 or 0,11%
 Bosniaks 1 or 0,01%
 Romani 0 or 0,00%
 other 74 or 0,74%
 not declared 337 or 3,38%
 no data 46 or 0,46%

Kotor
total 23.481
 Montenegrins 11.002 or 46,85%
 Ethnic Muslims 109 or 0,46%
 Serbs 7.197 or 30,65%
 Albanians 63 or 0,27%
 Croats 1.842 or 7,84%
 Bosniaks 17 or 0,07%
 Romani 36 or 0,15%
 other 746 or 3,18%
 not declared 2.255 or 9,60%
 no data 214

Mojkovac
total 10.274
 Montenegrins 5.627 or 54,77%
 Ethnic Muslims 18 or 0,18%
 Serbs 4.200 or 40,88%
 Albanians 1 or 0,01%
 Croats 3 or 0,03%
 Bosniaks9 or 0,09%
 Romani 0 or 0,00%
 other 53 or 0,52%
 not declared 332 or 3,23%
 no data 31 or 0,30%

Nikšić
total 76.671
 Montenegrins 47.923 or 62,50%
 Ethnic Muslims 733 or 0,96%
 Serbs 20.433 or 26,65%
 Albanians 32 or 0,04%
 Croats 139 or 0,18%
 Bosniaks 177 or 0,23%
 Romani 346 or 0,45%
 other 743 or 0,97%
 not declared 5.483 or 7,15%
 no data 662 or 0,86%

Plav
total 21.604
 Montenegrins 790 or 3,66%
 Ethnic Muslims 1.249 or 5,78%
 Serbs 2.731 or 12,64%
 Albanians 5.673 or 26,26%
 Croats 4 or 0,02%
 Bosniaks 10.960 or 50,73%
 Romani 0 or 0,00%
 other 78 or 0,36%
 not declared 73 or 0,34%
 no data 46 or 0,21%

Pljevlja
total 36.918
 Montenegrins 7.750 or 20,99%
 Ethnic Muslims 3.088 or 8,36%
 Serbs 21.972 or 59,52%
 Albanians 11 or 0,03%
 Croats 17 or 0,05%
 Bosniaks 2.023 or 5,48%
 Romani 0 or 0,00%
 other 148 or 0,40%
 not declared 1.705 or 4,62%
 no data 204 or 0,55%

Plužine
total 4.294
 Montenegrins 1.400 or 32,60%
 Ethnic Muslims 1 or 0,02%
 Serbs 2.601 or 60,57%
 Albanians 0 or 0,00%
 Croats 1 or 0,02%
 Bosniaks 0 or 0,00%
 Romani 0 or 0,00%
 other 12 or 0,28%
 not declared 260 or 6,05%
 no data 19 or 0,44%

Podgorica
total 179.403
 Montenegrins 98.562 or 54,94%
 Ethnic Muslims 4.782 or 2,67%
 Serbs 44.992 or 25,08%
 Albanians 14.238 or 7,94%
 Croats 734 or 0,41%
 Bosniaks 2.672 or 1,49%
 Romani 1.542 or 0,86%
 other 2.184 or 1,22%
 not declared 7.506 or 4,18%
 no data 2.191 or 1,22%

Rožaje
total 27.562
 Montenegrins 453 or 1,64%
 Ethnic Muslims 1.670 or 6,06%
 Serbs 916 or 3,32%
 Albanians 1.190 or 4,32%
 Croats 8 or 0,03%
 Bosniaks 22.512 or 81,68%
 Romani 15 or 0,05%
 other 405 or 1,47%
 not declared 73 or 0,26%
 no data 320 or 1,16%

Šavnik
total 2.972
 Montenegrins 1.386 or 46,64%
 Ethnic Muslims 5 or 0,17%
 Serbs 1.416 or 47,64%
 Albanians 0 or 0,00%
 Croats 3 or 0,10%
 Bosniaks 0 or 0,00%
 Romani 0 or 0,00%
 other 25 or 0,84%
 not declared 130 or 4,37%
 no data 7 or 0,24%

Tivat
total 13.991
 Montenegrins 4.126 or 29,49%
 Ethnic Muslims 165 or 1,18%
 Serbs 4.911 or 35,10%
 Albanians 144 or 1,03%
 Croats 2.761 or 19,73%
 Bosniaks 56 or 0,40%
 Romani 20 or 0,14%
 other 470 or 3,36%
 not declared 1.122 or 8,02%
 no data 216 or 1,54%

Ulcinj
total 26.435
 Montenegrins 2.523 or 9,54%
 Ethnic Muslims 692 or 2,62%
 Serbs 1.520 or 5,75%
 Albanians 20.664 or 78,17%
 Croats 70 or 0,26%
 Bosniaks 300 or 1,13%
 Romani 118 or 0,45%
 Black Montenegrins 185 or 0,70%
 other 185 or 0,70%
 not declared 216 or 0,82%
 no data 147 or 0,56%

Žabljak
total 4.245
 Montenegrins 1.819 or 42,85%
 Ethnic Muslims 1 or 0,02%
 Serbs 2.129 or 50,15%
 Albanians 0 or 0,00%
 Croats 3 or 0,07%
 Bosniaks 0 or 0,00%
 Romani 0 or 0,00%
 other 15 or 0,35%
 not declared 278 or 6,55%

This census witnessed the emerging of ethnic Bosniaks; although there are still people who declare themselves as ethnic Muslims. Also, there are very few people left who consider themselves Yugoslavs. Also a noticeable difference compared to 1991 census is the reemerging in the number of Serbs, from nearly 60,000 to 200,000 in a decade (compared to 1931s 90% strong Serb community).

Others include small ethnic groups of perceived non-European/Slavic origins: Romani, Balkan Egyptians and Black Montenegrins.

Linguistic structure

Serbian: 393,740 (63.49%)
Serbs - 197,684 (50.21%)
Montenegrins - 156,374 (39.71%)
Ethnic Muslims - 8,696 (2.21%)
Bosniaks - 2,723 (0.69%)
Croats - 2,529 (0.64%)
Yugoslavs - 1,705 (0.43%)
Albanians - 306 (0.08%)
Romany - 157 (0.04%)
others - 1,847 (0.47%)
undeclared and undefined - 18,610 (4.73%)
regional affiliation - 891 (0.23%)
unknown - 2,218 (0.56%)
Montenegrin: 136,208 (21.96%)
Montenegrins - 106,214 (78%)
Ethnic Muslims - 13,627 (10%)
Bosniaks - 12,549 (9.21%)
Croats - 1,375 (1.01%)
Serbs - 349 (0.26%)
Albanians - 330 (0.24%)
Yugoslavs - 33 (0.02%)
Romany - 8 (0.01%)
others - 349 (0.26%)
undeclared and undefined - 1,106 (0.81%)
regionally declared - 80 (0.06%)
unknown - 188 (0.14%)
Albanian: 32,603 (5.26%)
Albanians - 30,382 (93.19%)
Montenegrins - 776 (2.38%)
Ethnic Muslims - 414 (1.27%)
Romany - 288 (0.88%)
Bosniaks - 15 (0.05%)
Serbs - 8 (0.02%)
Yugoslavs - 8 (0.02%)
Croats - 3 (0.01%)
others - 361 (1.11%)
undeclared and undefined - 168 (0.51%)
regionally declared - 74 (0.23%)
unknown - 106 (0.32%)
Bosniak language: 19,906 (3.2%)
Bosniaks - 18,662 (93.75%)
Ethnic Muslims - 1,094 (5.5%)
Albanians - 72 (0.36%)
Montenegrins - 37 (0.19%)
Croats - 2 (0.01%)
Yugoslavs - 2 (0.01%)
others - 15 (0.07%)
undeclared and undefined - 11 (0.05%)
regionally declared - 6 (0.03%)
unknown - 5 (0.02%)
Bosnian: 14,172 (2.29%)
Bosniaks - 13,718 (96.8%)
Ethnic Muslims - 282 (1.99%)
Albanians - 38 (0.27%)
Montenegrins - 24 (0.17%)
Serbs - 6 (0.04%)
Croats - 6 (0.04%)
Yugoslavs - 1 (0.01%)
others - 15 (0.11%)
undeclared and undefined - 20 (0.14%)
regionally declared - 60 (0.42%)
unknown - 2 (0.01%)
Croatian: 2,791 (0.45%)
Croats - 2,438 (87.35%)
Serbs - 92 (3.3%)
Montenegrins - 82 (2.94%)
Yugoslavs - 15 (0.54%)
Ethnic Muslims - 11 (0.39%)
Bosniaks - 5 (0.18%)
Albanians - 4 (0.14%)
others - 36 (1.29%)
undeclared and undefined - 84 (3.01%)
regionally declared - 14 (0.5%)
unknown - 10 (0.36%)
Roma: 2,602 (0.42%)
Macedonian: 507 (0.08%)
Hungarian: 255 (0.04%)
Slovene: 232 (0.04%)
German: 126 (0.02%)
other: 3,101 (0.5%)
nondeclared and unknown: 13,902 (2.2%)

Religious structure

From 2003:
Orthodox Christianity - 460,383 (74.24%)
Montenegrins - 241,728 (52.51%)
Serbs - 196,333 (42.65%)
Yugoslavs - 1,286 (0.28%)
Romany - 250 (0.05%)
Croats - 107 (0.02%)
Ethnic Muslims - 71 (0.01%)
Bosniaks - 32 (0.01%)
Albanians - 27 (0.01%)
others - 2,191 (0.48%)
undeclared and undefined - 15,853 (3.44%)
regionally declared - 651 (0.14%)
unknown - 1,854 (0.4%)
Islam - 110,034 (17.74%)
Bosniaks - 47,852 (43.49%)
Ethnic Muslims - 24,111 (21.91%)
Albanians - 22,834 (20.75%)
Montenegrins - 11,710 (10.64%)
Romany - 1,942 (1.77%)
Yugoslavs - 38 (0.03%)
Serbs - 33 (0.03%)
Croats - 6 (0.01%)
others - 486 (0.44%)
undeclared and undefined - 766 (0.7%)
regionally declared - 75 (0.07%)
unknown - 181 (0.16%)
Roman Catholic - 21,972 (3.54%)
Albanians - 8,126 (36.98%)
Croats - 6,262 (28.5%)
Montenegrins - 5,000 (22.76%)
Yugoslavs - 128 (0.58%)
Serbs - 114 (0.52%)
Romany - 11 (0.05%)
Bosniaks - 4 (0.02%)
Ethnic Muslims - 4 (0.02%)
others - 1,112 (5.06%)
undeclared and undefined - 689 (3.14%)
regionally declared - 370 (1.68%)
unknown - 152 (0.69%)
Protestant - 383 (0.06%)
Montenegrins - 144 (37.6%)
Serbs - 51 (13.32%)
Romany - 18 (4.7%)
Bosniaks - 7 (1.83%)
Croats - 7 (1.83%)
Yugoslavs - 4 (1.04%)
Albanians - 2 (0.52%)
Ethnic Muslims - 1 (0.26%)
others - 103 (26.89%)
undeclared and undefined - 31 (8.09%)
regionally declared - 7 (1.83%)
unknown - 8 (2.09%)
occult - 58 (0.01%)
Montenegrins - 27 (46.55%)
Serbs - 2 (3.45%)
Bosniaks - 1 (1.72%)
Ethnic Muslims - 1 (1.72%)
Croats - 1 (1.72%)
others - 3 (5.17%)
undeclared and undefined - 2 (3.45%)
unknown - 1 (1.72%)
Judaism - 12
Montenegrins - 2 (16.67%)
Serbs - 2 (16.67%)
others - 8 (66.66%)
agnostics - 2,424 (0.39%)
nondeclared - 13,867 (2.24%)
none - 6,003 (0.97%)
unknown - 5,009 (0.8%)

Refugees from Kosovo
Montenegrins - 5,817
Serbs - 4,495
Romani - 3,105
Ethnic Muslims - 1,823
Egyptians - 1,539
Albanians - 457
Bosniaks - 333
Gorani 83
Ashkali - 79
Yugoslavs - 72
Croats - 27
Macedonians - 23
Slovenes 9
other - 53
nondeclared - 32
Total - 17,947

See also
Demographic history of Montenegro
 
 Demographics of the Kingdom of Yugoslavia
 Demographics of the Socialist Federal Republic of Yugoslavia
 Demographics of Serbia and Montenegro
 Demographics of Albania
 Demographics of Bosnia and Herzegovina
 Demographics of Croatia
 Demographics of Kosovo
 Demographics of Serbia

References 

 Montenegrin Census' from 1909 to 2003
 The Ethnic Structure of the Population in Montenegro

 
Demographics of Yugoslavia

pt:Montenegro#Demografia